The 2004 Tri Nations Series, an annual rugby union competition between the national teams of Australia, New Zealand and South Africa, was the ninth in the series. The competition is organised by SANZAR, a consortium of the three countries' rugby union federations. The series was contested in its original double round-robin format, with each team playing the others twice.

South Africa won the first ever Freedom Cup in a one-off home test against New Zealand. New Zealand retained the Bledisloe Cup against Australia.

Synopsis
South Africa continued to nurture and develop its rich vein of talent during the Tri-Nations, a competition in which South Africa had not been competitive in three years. However, things were to be different this time as the Boks ploughed their way into the opposition, most notably with a herculean backline display that gave South Africa 10 of its glut of 13 tries in four Tri-Nations matches, as opposed to the All Blacks' much vaunted and feared backline's display of 4 in four games. South Africa's improved displays made for the tightest competition so far in the history of the Tri-Nations.

The Boks opener against the All Blacks was a thriller with Boks 'rush' defence rattling the Kiwis 'flat' attack to its core. After 80 minutes the Boks were ahead before a thrilling attack from the All Blacks claimed a last second try to win the game, courtesy of Doug Howlett. However, the Boks could take a lot out of this game and approached the Wallabies with a spring in their step. The Wallabies too caused South Africa heartache as ex South African under 21s captain Clyde Rathbone snatched the winner for the Aussies with minutes to go.

As the series shifted to South Africa, the Boks needed to beat the All Blacks in order to keep their hopes of a Tri-Nations title, a first since 1998, alive. They did so with vigour as they brushed aside the All Blacks with disdain, providing the authoritative finishing and poise which was lacking to a degree in the first game between the Southern rivals. The only area of the game in which New Zealand competed well was the scoreboard. After going 10–0 down early on South Africa went into the second half ahead, again. However, unlike the first game South Africa provided what they sought out to do with a strong second half display, as they pulled away from the All Blacks, 5 tries to 2. Bok centre Marius Joubert equalled an SA record for the most tries against the All Blacks in the process with a hat trick of tries.

This set up a winner-take-all battle against the Wallabies in Durban. The Boks fell behind 7–3 in a tightly played first half. In the second, they scored tries from forwards Victor Matfield and Joe van Niekerk. While the Wallabies got more tries (three), the difference proved to be the boot of fullback Percy Montgomery, who converted both Boks tries and kicked three penalties to give the Boks a 23–19 win and the Tri-Nations trophy. While the Boks had many heroes in their run through the Tri-Nations, perhaps the greatest was Schalk Burger, who more than lived up to his enormous promise and established himself as arguably the top flanker in the world.

Aftermath

New Zealand
The 2004 Tri-Nations was a disappointing start to the tenures of the new All Blacks coaching staff. Many blamed New Zealand's failure in this tournament to a reliance on the so-called 'flat backline', and as backs coach Wayne Smith drew the brunt of the criticism. The All Black careers of ageing stars Carlos Spencer and Andrew Merhtens were effectively ended by a series of poor performances, and on the end of year tour to Europe Dan Carter emerged as the new #1 All Blacks first-five eighth.

South Africa
In this tournament, the Springboks definitively reemerged as a force in the professional era of rugby union. Going into the Tri Nations, South Africa rugby was in turmoil, best exemplified by the debacle of the 2003 World Cup and the scandal of Kamp Staaldraad. With the emergence of Schalk Burger, Jean de Villiers and Marius Joubert as major stars, the Boks used this momentum to become the 2004 IRB Team of the Year. South Africa would sweep the major IRB awards, as Burger earned IRB Player of the Year honours and coach Jake White was named IRB Coach of the Year.

Format
As in past competitions, points were earned on the following schedule:

4 points for a win
2 points for a draw
0 points for a loss
1 bonus point for scoring 4 tries or more, (win, lose, or draw)
1 bonus point for a loss by 7 points or less

Table

Scorers

Notes

External links
Tri Nations at Rugby.com.au

The Rugby Championship
Tri
Tri
Tri Nations Series
Tri